On June 4, 1812, the Missouri Territory was created following the creation of the state of Louisiana. The Arkansas Territory was spun off in 1819. The state of Missouri was separated in 1821 and the remaining land was annexed by the Michigan Territory in 1834.

List of delegates representing the district

References 

Territory
At-large United States congressional districts
Former congressional districts of the United States
Constituencies established in 1812
1812 establishments in Missouri Territory
Constituencies disestablished in 1821
1821 disestablishments in Missouri Territory